Friedrich "Fritz" Sternberg (11 June 1895 – 18 October 1963) was a German economist, sociologist, Marxist theorist, and socialist politician. Bertolt Brecht declared Sternberg to be his "first teacher."

Works
 Die Juden als Träger einer neuen Wirtschaft in Palästina. Eine Studie. Vienna 1921.
 Der Imperialismus. Berlin 1926.
 Der Imperialismus und seine Kritiker. Berlin 1929.
 Eine Umwälzung der Wissenschaft? Kritik des Buches von Henryk Großmann: Das Akkumulations- und Zusammenbruchgesetz des kapitalistischen Systems. Zugleich eine positive Analyse des Imperialismus. Berlin 1930
 Der Niedergang des deutschen Kapitalismus. Berlin 1932.
 Der Faschismus an der Macht. Amsterdam 1935.
 Germany and a Lightning War. London 1938.
 From Nazi Sources. Why Hitler can't win. New York/Toronto 1939.
 Die deutsche Kriegsstärke. Wie lange kann Hitler Krieg führen. Paris 1939.
 The coming Crisis. New York/Toronto 1947.
 How to stop the Russians without war. New York/Toronto 1948.
 Living with the Crisis. The Battle against Depression and War. New York 1949.
 Capitalism and Socialism on Trial. New York 1951.
 The End of a Revolution. Soviet Russia - From Revolution to Reaction. New York 1953.
 Marx und die Gegenwart. Entwicklungstendenzen in der zweiten Hälfte des zwanzigsten Jahrhunderts. Cologne 1955.
 Die militärische und die industrielle Revolution. Berlin/Frankfurt am Main 1959.
 Wer beherrscht die zweite Hälfte des 20. Jahrhunderts? Cologne/Berlin 1961.
 Der Dichter und die Ratio. Erinnerungen an Bertolt Brecht. Göttingen 1963.
 Anmerkungen zu Marx - heute. Frankfurt am Main 1965.

Bibliography
 Grebing, Helga (ed.). Fritz Sternberg: Für die Zukunft des Sozialismus (Schriftenreihe der Otto Brenner Stiftung Nr. 23), Frankfurt am Main 1981.

References

External links
 Christoph Jünke: The Forgotten German Marxist Who Criticized Imperialism, 07/12/2022, jacobin.com

Marxist theorists
German Marxists
1895 births
1963 deaths
German male writers